Volkert Merl (born 10 February 1944) is a retired German racing driver.

Merl primarily competed for Joest Racing throughout his career in the early 1980s competing in the World Sportscar Championship and Deutsche Rennsport Meisterschaft (DRM). He won the 1980 24 Hours of Daytona with Rolf Stommelen and Reinhold Joest in a Porsche 935 and placed second in 1983 DRM championship points in a Porsche 956. That same year, he also finished 4th in the 24 Hours of Le Mans.

Racing record

24 Hours of Le Mans results

External links
Volkert Merl at Driver Database

1944 births
German racing drivers
24 Hours of Le Mans drivers
Living people
24 Hours of Daytona drivers
World Sportscar Championship drivers

Team Joest drivers